This is a list of player signings and releases involving Super Rugby teams in Australia prior to the end of the 2016 Super Rugby season. The release of a player that was included in a 2015 Super Rugby season squad, or the signing of a new player for the 2016 season is listed here regardless of when it occurred. Players that have been confirmed for the 2016 season are also listed, regardless of when they signed for the team.

Notes:
 2015 players listed are all players that were named in the initial senior squad, or subsequently included in a 23-man match day squad at any game during the season.
 (did not play) denotes that a player did not play at all during one of the two seasons due to injury or non-selection. These players are included to indicate they were contracted to the team.
 (short-term) denotes that a player wasn't initially contracted, but came in during the season. This could either be a club rugby player coming in as injury cover, or a player whose contract had expired at another team (typically in the northern hemisphere). 
 Flags are only shown for players moving to or from another country.
 Players may play in several positions, but are listed in only one.

Brumbies

Force

Rebels

Reds

Waratahs

See also
 List of 2015–16 Premiership Rugby transfers
 List of 2015–16 Pro12 transfers
 List of 2015–16 Top 14 transfers
 List of 2015–16 RFU Championship transfers
 List of 2015 SuperLiga transfers
 SANZAAR
 Super Rugby franchise areas

References

2015
2016 Super Rugby season
2015 Super Rugby season